Reed Bohovich (November 18, 1941 – October 1, 2011) was an American football guard. He played for the New York Giants in 1962.

References

1941 births
2011 deaths
Players of American football from Buffalo, New York
American football guards
Lehigh Mountain Hawks football players
New York Giants players